Juan Carvajal may refer to:

 Juan Carvajal (cardinal) (c. 1400–1469), Spanish cardinal
 Juan Carvajal (footballer) (born 1986), Chilean footballer
 Juan de Carvajal (fl. 16th century), Spanish conquistador
 Juan Suárez Carvajal (1485–1584), Spanish Roman Catholic Bishop of Lugo 1539–1561